Cimanggis is an administrative district in the city of Depok, within the province of West Java, Indonesia. Cimanggis is located in the north of Depok. It covers an area of 21.58 km2 and had a population of 241,979 at the 2010 Census; the latest official estimate (as at mid 2018) is 324,343.

Village
Cimanggis is divided in 6 Villages:
Curug
Harjamukti
Cisalak Pasar
Mekarsari

Pasir Gunung Selatan

References

Depok
Populated places in West Java